The terms Chinese Israeli or Israeli Chinese may refer to:

People's Republic of China–Israel relations
Chinese people in Israel, including guest workers, Jews from China, and others
Israelis in China
Mixed race people of Israeli and Chinese descent
Multiple citizenship of Israel and either the People's Republic of China or the Republic of China

See also
Aliyah
Kaifeng Jews
History of the Jews in China